A handheld television is a portable device for watching television that usually uses a TFT LCD or OLED and CRT color display.  Many of these devices resemble handheld transistor radios.

History

In the 1970s and early 1980s, Panasonic and Sinclair Research released the first TVs which were small enough to fit in a large pocket; called the Panasonic IC TV MODEL TR-001 and MTV-1.  Since LCD technology was not yet mature at the time, the TV used a minuscule CRT which set the record for being the smallest CRT on a commercially marketed product.

Later in 1982, Sony released their first model - the FD-200, which was introduced as “Flat TV” later renamed after the nickname  Watchman, a play on the word Walkman.  It had grayscale video at first.  Several years later, a color model with an active-matrix LCD was released.  Some smartphones integrate a television receiver, although Internet broadband video is far more common.

Since the switch-over to digital broadcasting, handheld TVs have reduced in size and improved in quality. Portable TV was eventually brought to digital TV with DVB-H, although it didn't see much success. The major current manufacturers of DVB-T standard (common throughout Europe) handheld TVs are August International, ODYS and Xoro.

Hardware

These devices often have stereo 1⁄8 inch (3.5 mm) phono plugs for composite video-analog mono audio relay to serve them as composite monitors; also, some models have mono 3.5 mm jacks for the broadcast signal that is usually relayed via F connector or Belling-Lee connector on standard television models.

Some include HDMI, USB and SD ports.

Some handheld televisions also double as portable DVD players and USB personal video recorders.

Size
Portable televisions cannot fit in a pocket, but often run on batteries and include a cigarette lighter receptacle plug.

Pocket televisions fit in a pocket.

Wearable televisions sometimes are made in the form of a wristwatch.

Notable brands and models
 August International - DA100C
 ODYS - LIVE
 Xoro - HSD7790
 RCA - DPTM70R
 Sony - Watchman and Bravia
 Casio
 Sanyo
 Sinclair Research - MTV-1 and TV80

See also
Handheld electronics
Boombox television (in Boombox § History)

References

External links
History of the pocket TV

Portable electronics
Mobile technology
Television technology